Canoe polo at the 2005 World Games.

Medalists

See also
 Canoe polo at the World Games

References

 
 

2005 World Games